The 2016 Oklahoma Sooners football team represented the University of Oklahoma in the 2016 NCAA Division I FBS football season, the 122nd season of Sooner football. The team was led by head coach Bob Stoops, offensive coordinator Lincoln Riley, and defensive coordinator Mike Stoops, as well as such players as Mark Andrews, Orlando Brown, Jordan Evans, Baker Mayfield, Joe Mixon, Ogbonnia Okoronkwo, Samaje Perine, and Dede Westbrook.

OU was ranked third in the 2016 preseason AP and Coaches’ polls. The Sooners lost two of its first three games to non-conference foes (#15 Houston and #3 Ohio State), and neither game was especially close. By the end of September, OU had dropped completely out of the top 25 of both polls. At that time in late September, four of its Big 12 rivals were ranked above them.

Conference play began on October 1 with a 52–46 win at AP #21 TCU and ended with a 38–20 home win against #11 Oklahoma State. Oklahoma finished conference play with a 9–0 record, winning their eleventh Big 12 Championship and second consecutive championship in a row. The conference championship was Stoops’ 10th championship in his 18 years as OU head coach. 

Despite the 9 consecutive wins and the conference championship, OU missed out on a return to the 4-team national championship playoff. 

Oklahoma did play in the 2017 Sugar Bowl against the Auburn Tigers, winning handily, 35–19. Oklahoma finished the season ranked 5th in the AP poll and 3rd in the Coaches poll, with an 11–2 record.

On June 7, 2017, Stoops announced his retirement after 18 seasons as head coach. Offensive coordinator Lincoln Riley was promoted to head coach.

Previous season and offseason

The 2015 Oklahoma Sooners football team finished the regular season with an 11–1 record winning their ninth Big 12 Championship. Their only regular-season loss was against Texas in the Red River Showdown. Oklahoma became bowl eligible after defeating Texas Tech on October 24, 2015. Oklahoma was selected as the fourth seed to play in the 2015 College Football playoff against first seed Clemson in the Orange Bowl, which ended up being a 37-17 loss. Oklahoma finished the season 11–2.

Personnel

Coaching staff

Roster

Schedule
Oklahoma announced their 2016 football schedule on November 24, 2015. The 2016 schedule consists of 6 home games, 4 away games and 2 neutral-site games in the regular season. The Sooners will host two non-conference games against Louisiana–Monroe and Ohio State and travel to Houston, Texas to play Houston in NRG Stadium, a non-conference game at a neutral site. Oklahoma will host Kansas State, Kansas, Baylor and Oklahoma State, and travel to TCU, Texas Tech, Iowa State and West Virginia in regular conference play. Oklahoma will play the Texas Longhorns in Dallas, Texas at the Cotton Bowl stadium on October 8 for the Red River Showdown, the 111th game played of the series.

Game summaries

at No. 15 Houston

vs Louisiana–Monroe

vs No. 3 Ohio State

Kickoff was delayed from the original start time of 6:30 P.M. to 8:00 P.M. due to lightning and thunderstorms in the vicinity of the University of Oklahoma.

at No. 21 TCU

vs Texas

vs Kansas State

at Texas Tech

Kansas

Iowa State

Baylor

West Virginia

Oklahoma State

Auburn (Sugar Bowl)

Rankings

2017 NFL Draft

The 2017 NFL Draft was held in front of the Philadelphia Museum of Art in Philadelphia on April 27–29, 2017. The following Oklahoma players were either selected or signed as free agents following the draft.

References

Oklahoma
Oklahoma Sooners football seasons
Big 12 Conference football champion seasons
Sugar Bowl champion seasons
Oklahoma Sooners football